Truagh is a barony in County Monaghan, Republic of Ireland.

Etymology
Trough is known in Irish as An Triúcha (Old Irish trícha cét, "cantred").

Location

Trough is found in north County Monaghan, south of the Ulster Blackwater.

Trough barony is bordered to the south by Monaghan, County Monaghan; to the northwest by Clogher, County Tyrone; and to the northeast by Lower Dungannon, County Tyrone.

History
The Mac Kenna were chiefs of Trough. O'Clerkin is also noted here.

List of settlements

Below is a list of settlements in Trough barony:
Emyvale
Glaslough

References

Baronies of County Monaghan